Daniel G. Griffey (born 1970) is an American firefighter and politician from Washington. Griffey is a  Republican member of Washington House of Representatives. In 2014, Griffey defeated Democratic incumbent Kathy Haigh to pick up one of four House seats gained by Washington Republicans that year.

Career 
At age 16, Griffey became a volunteer firefighter. In 1992, Griffey became a firefighter for Central Mason Fire Department in Mason County. Griffey became a lieutenant.

Griffey is the ranking minority member on the House Local Government Committee and also sits on the Early Learning and Human Services and Public Safety Committees. Representative Griffey was selected by House Republican leadership to serve as Assistant Whip.

Griffey has been a leading proponent to eliminate the statute of limitations for rape.

Personal life 
Griffey's wife is Dinah Griffey. They have three children. Griffey and his family live in Allyn, Washington.

References

External links 
 Dan Griffey at ballotpedia.org

Living people
People from Mason County, Washington
American firefighters
Republican Party members of the Washington House of Representatives
21st-century American politicians
1970 births